Isaiah First Prophet of Old is a Big Youth album released in 1978.

Track listing

Personnel
 Big Youth - Main Performer, Vocals, Percussion,
 Rita Marley - Vocals
 George Fullwood - Bass
 Carlton "Santa" Davis - Percussion, Drums
 Earl "Chinna" Smith - Guitar
 Earl Lindo - Clarinet, Keyboards, Organ
 Tony Chin - Guitar
 Vin Gordon - Trombone
 Sylvan Morris - Engineer, Percussion
 Errol Thompson - Engineer
 Keith Sterling - Piano
 Uziah "Sticky" Thompson - Percussion
 Scott Morris - Percussion
 Judy Mowatt - Vocals
 Herman Marquis - Saxophone
 Bobby Ellis - Trumpet

Recording Information
 Recording : Harry J Studio, Kingston, Jamaica & Joe Gibbs Studio, Kingston, Jamaica
 Engineer : Errol Thompson

External links
Big Youth - Isaiah First Prophet Of Old at Roots Archives

1978 albums
Big Youth albums
Caroline Records albums